William Ainsworth may refer to:

William Harrison Ainsworth (1805–1882), English historical novelist
William Francis Ainsworth (1807–1896), English surgeon, traveller, geographer and geologist
William Ainsworth (politician) (1875–1945), Australian politician